Fausto Ippoliti (born 25 May 1979) is an Italian racing driver from Rome.

Fausto Ippoliti's Career
1997: 4th Italian Formula Campus

1999: 3rd Italian Formula 3 Federal

2000: 13th Formula Renault 2000 Eurocup

2001: 5th Formula Renault 2000 Eurocup

2002: 5th Italian Formula 3 Championship (three podiums).

2003: 1st Italian Formula 3 Championship

2004: 7th Euro Formula 3000

2005: 7th Euro Formula 3000

2006: 12th Euro Formula 3000, 21st Formula 3000 Masters

External links
 Ippoliti Racing Team

1979 births
Italian racing drivers
Living people
Italian Formula Three Championship drivers
Formula Renault Eurocup drivers
Italian Formula Renault 2.0 drivers
Auto GP drivers

Piquet GP drivers
Draco Racing drivers
Target Racing drivers
Cram Competition drivers